Bixby is a census-designated place (CDP) in Cameron County, Texas, United States. The population was 504 at the 2010 census. It is part of the Brownsville–Harlingen Metropolitan Statistical Area.

Geography
Bixby is located at  (26.143269, -97.857239).

Demographics
At the 2000 census there were 356 people in 102 households, including 88 families, in the CDP. The population density was 216.4 people per square mile (83.3/km). There were 126 housing units at an average density of 76.6/sq mi (29.5/km).  The racial makeup of the CDP was 81.46% White, 1.40% Native American, 0.28% Asian, 13.48% from other races, and 3.37% from two or more races. Hispanic or Latino of any race were 76.97%.

Of the 102 households 51.0% had children under the age of 18 living with them, 65.7% were married couples living together, 17.6% had a female householder with no husband present, and 13.7% were non-families. 11.8% of households were one person and 4.9% were one person aged 65 or older. The average household size was 3.49 and the average family size was 3.81.

The age distribution was 37.1% under the age of 18, 8.7% from 18 to 24, 26.4% from 25 to 44, 18.5% from 45 to 64, and 9.3% 65 or older. The median age was 29 years. For every 100 females, there were 95.6 males. For every 100 females age 18 and over, there were 94.8 males.

The median income for a household in the CDP was $12,639, and the median family income was $13,819. Males had a median income of $20,625 versus $11,250 for females. The per capita income for the CDP was $4,852. About 53.1% of families and 43.5% of the population were below the poverty line, including 52.7% of those under age 18 and none of those age 65 or over.

Education
Bixby is served by the La Feria Independent School District.

In addition, South Texas Independent School District operates magnet schools that serve the community.

References

Census-designated places in Cameron County, Texas
Census-designated places in Texas